The 1911 FA Charity Shield was the fourth Charity Shield, an annual football match contested by the winners of the previous season's Football League and Southern League competitions. The match was played on 25 September 1911 between Manchester United, winners of the 1910–11 Football League, and Swindon Town, winners of the 1910–11 Southern League. Manchester United won the match 8–4 in front of only 10,000 fans at Stamford Bridge, London.

The match remains the highest-scoring match in Charity Shield history. Harold Halse scored six goals for Manchester United in this match, a record for the most goals scored by an individual in a Charity Shield match. It is also a record for the most goals scored by an individual Manchester United player in one match, a record that was not equalled for almost 60 years, until George Best in an 8–2 win over Northampton Town on 7 February 1970.

Match details

References

1911
Comm
Charity Shield 1911
Charity Shield 1911
Charity Shield
Charity Shield